Rodney Caston (born May 13, 1977) is an American writer. He is credited as the co-creator of the popular comic book series MegaTokyo.

Fandom
Caston is credited as a co-creator and writer of the first volume of the popular comic book series Megatokyo, and as a co-creator of the second volume.  He has since parted ways with partner Fred Gallagher and relinquished his interest in Megatokyo. In July 2004, Megatokyo was the tenth best-selling manga property in the U.S.

Published works
 Megatokyo Volume 1: Chapter Zero (Megatokyo vol.1 1st ed.) 
 Megatokyo Volume 1, 2nd ed.  (2004)
 Megatokyo Volume 2  (2004)
 The Government Hacker Threat Landscape

Political Affiliations
Caston is a former member of the Libertarian Party. In 2008, he ran, unsuccessfully, for constable in the state of Texas against Republican Chuck Presley, Sr. He received 19,079 votes (19% of the total votes cast) to Presley's 79,039 votes (81% of the total cast). In 2012, he ran, again unsuccessfully, for Texas State Representative of District 106 for the Libertarian Party against Pat Fallon; he received 8,412 votes (17% of the total votes cast) to Fallon's 41,582 (83% of the total cast)

References

1977 births
Living people
American comic strip cartoonists
American libertarians
American webcomic creators
Megatokyo